The second Negro National League was one of the several Negro leagues that were established during the period in the United States when organized baseball was segregated. The league was founded in 1933 by businessman Gus Greenlee of Pittsburgh.

League history 

The second Negro National League was established in 1933 by Gus Greenlee, an African-American businessman of Pittsburgh, Pennsylvania, two years after the first Negro National League had disbanded, after the start of the Great Depression. The second Negro National League lasted until 1948, the year after Major League Baseball integrated. After that, its surviving teams merged into the Negro American League.

To distinguish between the two Negro National Leagues, they are usually referred to as the first Negro National League (NNL I) and the second Negro National League (NNL II).

Negro National League franchises 

''Annual final standings: 1933, 1934, 1935, 1936, 1937, 1938, 1939, 1940, 1941, 1942, 1943, 1944, 1945, 1946, 1947, 1948
 Baltimore Black Sox (I) (1933)
 Brooklyn Royal Giants (1933)
 Cole's American Giants (1933–1935)
 Columbus Blue Birds / Akron Black Tyrites / Cleveland Giants (1933) – moved during season
 Indianapolis ABC's (II) / Detroit Stars (II) (1933) – moved to Detroit in April
 Nashville Elite Giants (1933–1934) / Columbus Elite Giants (1935) / Washington Elite Giants (1936–1937) / Baltimore Elite Giants (1938–1948)
 Pittsburgh Crawfords (1933–1938)
 Philadelphia Bacharach Giants (1934)
 Cleveland Red Sox (1934)
 Baltimore Black Sox (II) (1934)
 (Washington) Homestead Grays (1934–1948)
 †Newark Dodgers (1934–1935) / Newark Eagles (1936–1948)
 Philadelphia Stars (1934–1948)
 †Brooklyn Eagles (1935)
 New York Cubans (1935–1936; 1939–1948)
 New York Black Yankees (1936–1948)
 Washington Black Senators (1938)

†The Brooklyn Eagles and Newark Dodgers merged to form the Newark Eagles in 1936.

Member timeline 

1933: Formation of the second Negro National League, consisting of 7 teams — Baltimore Black Sox, Cole's American Giants, Columbus Blue Birds, Indianapolis ABCs (II) (moved to Detroit in April), Homestead Grays, Nashville Elite Giants and Pittsburgh Crawfords; Homestead was expelled early in the season for raiding Detroit's roster, Columbus was replaced mid-season by the Akron Black Tyrites who were then replaced by the Cleveland Giants.
1934: Dropped Cleveland Giants, Detroit Stars, Baltimore Black Sox (I); Added Philadelphia Bacharach Giants, Cleveland Red Sox, Philadelphia Stars and Baltimore Black Sox (II); Retained Homestead Grays as an associate team.
1935: Dropped Philadelphia Bacharach Giants, Baltimore Black Sox (II) and Cleveland Red Sox; Added Brooklyn Eagles, Homestead Grays, New York Cubans and Newark Dodgers.
1936: Dropped Cole's American Giants; Brooklyn and Newark merged.
1937: Dropped New York Cubans; Added New York Black Yankees.
1938: Added Washington Black Senators.
1939: Dropped Pittsburgh Crawfords and Washington Black Senators; Re-added New York Cubans.
1948: League disbanded after completion of season; All teams continued on with Baltimore, Philadelphia, Newark and New York Cubans joining the Negro American League for the 1949 season, while the Grays and Black Yankees playing independent of a league.

League champions

Pennant winners 

From 1937 and 1938, 1940, and 1942 through 1946, the team in first place at the end of the season was declared the pennant winner (league champion).  Due to the unorthodox nature of the schedule (and little incentive to enforce it), some teams frequently played many more games than others did in any given season. In 1933, Cole's Chicago American Giants claimed the first half title, but the Pittsburgh Crawfords won the second half and had an overall better record. The following year saw the Stars have a better winning percentage that saw them compete against the third place Chicago team despite the fact Pittsburgh played (and won) more games. This led to some disputed championships and two teams claiming the title.  Generally, the team with the best winning percentage (with some minimum number of games played) was awarded the pennant, but other times it was the team with the most victories.  The "games behind" method of recording standings was uncommon in most black leagues.

† – Pennant was decided via a split-season schedule with the winner of the first half of the season playing the winner of the second half of the season.
* – Pennant was decided via a 2-round play-off between the top four teams.
‡ – Pennant winner went on to play in the Negro World Series.

League play-offs 
On five occasions, the League held a postseason series to determine the pennant champion.

1933 would have been the first to match the first and second half champions, but the Pittsburgh Crawfords were instead awarded the pennant over the first half champion Chicago American Giants. 1936 had an array of games that may or may not have been formal postseason games. For example, the Washington Elite Giants won the first half after beating the Philadelphia Stars 7–5 in a one-game match on September 17.  Pittsburgh (who had a better record overall) faced the Newark Eagles from September 12–15 and won 3–1–1 in either a second-half playoff or a regular series-turned-playoff. Washington and Pittsburgh played three games from September 21–27, but no box scores exist for the games (which Washington won two of three) in a series that was evidently abandoned. 

In one year (1939), the top four teams (Homestead Grays, Newark Eagles, Baltimore Elite Giants, Philadelphia Stars) were matched together in a best-of-five tournament. The Grays beat the Stars in five games while the Elite Giants beat the Eagles in four games to set up the Championship Series. The New York Cubans won the second half of the 1947 season but advanced to the Negro World Series over the Newark Eagles (first half champions). 1948 ended prematurely after a controversial finish to a disputed tie game in the third game.

Negro World Series 

For the duration of the league, a Negro World Series took place seven times, from 1942 through 1948. The Negro National League's pennant winner met the champion of the rival Negro American League. Five out of the seven years, the Negro National League team (below in bold) prevailed.

1942 – Kansas City Monarchs beat Washington Homestead Grays, 4 games to 0 games
1943 – Washington Homestead Grays beat Birmingham Black Barons, 4 games to 3 games
1944 – Washington Homestead Grays beat Birmingham Black Barons, 4 games to 1 game
1945 – Cleveland Buckeyes beat Washington Homestead Grays, 4 games to 0 games
1946 – Newark Eagles beat Kansas City Monarchs, 4 games to 3 games
1947 – New York Cubans beat Cleveland Buckeyes, 4 games to 1 game
1948 – Washington Homestead Grays beat Birmingham Black Barons, 4 games to 1 game

References

Sources 

Negro baseball leagues
Defunct baseball leagues in the United States
African-American sports history
Defunct professional sports leagues in the United States
Sports leagues established in 1933
Sports leagues disestablished in 1948
1933 establishments in the United States
1948 disestablishments in the United States